Cartesian anxiety refers to a dilemma that you either have a fixed and stable foundation for knowledge or you cannot escape chaos and confusion. The dilemma produces an anxiety that arises from people craving an absolute ground either in the outside world or in the mind.

The dilemma emerged after René Descartes posited his influential form of body-mind dualism. Ever since, western civilization has suffered from a longing for ontological certainty, or feeling that scientific methods, and especially the study of the world as a thing separate from ourselves, should be able to lead us to a firm and unchanging knowledge of ourselves and the world around us.

The term is named after Descartes because of his well-known emphasis on "mind" as different from "body", "self" as different from "other".

Richard J. Bernstein coined the term in his 1983 book Beyond Objectivism and Relativism: Science, Hermeneutics, and Praxis.

References 

Philosophy of science